Tamarus Valley is an ice-free valley lying south of Sabrina Ridge and 2.5 nautical miles (4.6 km) northeast of Mount Henderson in the Britannia Range. Named in association with Britannia by a University of Waikato (N.Z.) geological party, 1978–79, led by Michael Selby. Tamarus is the historical name used in Roman Britain for the River Tamar.

Valleys of Oates Land